Pane di Altamura is a type of Italian naturally leavened bread made from remilled durum wheat semola from the Altamura area of the Provincia di Bari, in the Apulia region.

In 2003 Pane di Altamura was granted PDO status within Europe.

By law, it must be produced according to a range of strict conditions, including using particular varieties of durum wheat (all locally produced), a certain specification of water, a consistent production method, and must also have a final crust that is at least 3 mm thick. The shape of the bread is not essential for a loaf to be certified, but there are some traditional shapes.

Official production zone consists of the Comuni of:
 Altamura
 Gravina in Puglia
 Laterza
 Matera
 Poggiorsini
 Santeramo in colle
 Spinazzola
 Minervino Murge

See also 
 Altamura
 Altamura Man
 Pulo di Altamura
 Altamurana

References 
Consorzio per la tutela del Pane di Altamura(in Italian) (Accessed 18 July 2010)

Italian breads
Cuisine of Apulia
Italian products with protected designation of origin